Trachelanthus may refer to:
 Trachelanthus (plant), a genus of flowering plants in the family Boraginaceae
 Trachelanthus (weevil), a genus of weevils in the family Curculionidae